Acanthurus lineatus, the lined surgeonfish, is a member of the family Acanthuridae, the surgeonfishes. Other common names include blue banded surgeonfish, blue-lined surgeonfish, clown surgeonfish, pyjama tang,  striped surgeonfish, and zebra surgeonfish.

Description
This species reaches about 38 centimeters in length. Much of the body has black-edged blue and yellow stripes, and the top of the head is striped with yellow. The belly is grayish. The pectoral fins have darkened rays and the pelvic fins are yellow-brown with black margins. Individuals from around the Philippines vary in coloration. The sharp, forward-pointing spines on the caudal peduncle are venomous.

Distribution
A. lineatus occurs in the Indian Ocean from East Africa to the western Pacific Ocean to the Great Barrier Reef,  Japan, Polynesia, and Hawaii.

Habitat
The lined surgeonfish is associated with reefs, living in marine waters just a few meters deep. It is benthopelagic.

Behaviour
The fish is territorial, with a large male defending a feeding territory and a harem of females. The adults may also school, and they gather en masse during spawning. The juvenile is solitary. The fish is mostly herbivorous, but might eat crustaceans at times. Most of its diet is algae. It grazes during the day.

Acanthurus lineatus species found in Australia, in the Indian Ocean have a greater defense rate against intruders. Lined surgeonfish in the Indian Ocean have a smaller body size, allowing them to have greater access and abundance of food, due to hurricane damage to reefs, enhancing the overall algal turfs that Acanthurus lineatus feed on.

Human uses
This species is of commercial and ornamental value. It is especially important among the reef fishes of American Samoa. In some areas it is heavily exploited, but it lives in many protected zones and in general it is widespread and common.

References

External links
 
 

Acanthuridae
Acanthurus
Fish of Hawaii
Fish described in 1758
Taxa named by Carl Linnaeus